There have been three baronetcies created for personswith the surname Elphinstone, two in the Baronetage of Nova Scotia and one in the Baronetage of the United Kingdom. As of 2008 two of the creations are extant while one is dormant.

The Elphinstone Baronetcy, of Elphinstone in the County of Lanark, was created in the Baronetage of Nova Scotia on 20 June 1628 for William Elphinstone. On his death in 1645 the title became dormant.

The Elphinstone Baronetcy, of Logie in the County of Aberdeen, was created in the Baronetage of Nova Scotia on 2 December 1701 for James Elphinstone, with remainder to heirs male whatsoever. The title became dormant on the death of the fourth Baronet in 1743. In 1927 Alexander Logie Elphinstone, the tenth Baronet, managed to claim the title as a descendant of Nicholas Elphinstone, grandson of Sir Henry Elphinstone of Pittendreich, who succeeded to the Elphinstone estates in Stirlingshire in 1435 and who was also the grandfather of Alexander Elphinstone, 1st Lord Elphinstone. The eleventh Baronet is a claimant to the dormant Elphinstone Baronetcy of Elphinstone (see above).

The Elphinstone Baronetcy, of Sowerby in the County of Cumberland, was created in the Baronetage of the United Kingdom on 25 May 1816 for Major-General Howard Elphinstone, a veteran of the Peninsular War. He was the youngest son of John Elphinstone, a captain in the Royal Navy and admiral in the Russian Navy. The second Baronet sat as Liberal Member of Parliament for Hastings and Lewes.

Elphinstone baronets, of Elphinstone (1628)
Sir William Elphinstone, 1st Baronet (died 1645), secretary to Elizabeth Stuart, Queen of Bohemia

Elphinstone (Elphinston) baronets, of Logie (1701)
Sir James Elphinstone, 1st Baronet (–1722)
Sir John Elphinstone, 2nd Baronet (1675–1732)
Sir James Elphinstone, 3rd Baronet (c. 1710–1739)
Sir John Elphinstone, 4th Baronet (c. 1717–1743) (dormant)
Sir John Elphinstone, de jure 5th Baronet (1665–1758)
Sir Alexander Elphinstone, de jure 6th Baronet (died 1795)
Sir John Elphinstone, de jure 7th Baronet (1771–1835)
Sir Alexander Elphinstone, de jure 8th Baronet (1801–1888)
Sir John Elphinstone, de jure 9th Baronet (1834–1893)
Sir Alexander Logie Elphinstone, 10th Baronet (1880–1970) (claimed title 1927)
Sir John Elphinston, 11th Baronet (1924–2015)
Sir Alexander Elphinston, 12th Baronet (born 1955)

The heir apparent to the baronetcy is the 12th baronet's eldest son, Daniel John Elphinston (born 1989).

Elphinstone baronets, of Sowerby (1816)
Sir Howard Elphinstone, 1st Baronet (1773–1846)
Sir Howard Elphinstone, 2nd Baronet (1804–1893)
Sir Howard Warburton Elphinstone, 3rd Baronet (1830–1917)
Sir Howard Graham Elphinstone, 4th Baronet (1898–1975) m. Alice Mary "Mollie" Emerton Brown
Sir Maurice Douglas Warburton Elphinstone FRSE, 5th Baronet (1909–1995)
Sir John Howard Main Elphinstone, 6th Baronet (born 1949)

The heir presumptive to the baronetcy is a cousin of the 6th baronet, Henry Charles Elphinstone (born 1958). He is the only son of Rowland Henry Elphinstone (1915–1997), the 4th and youngest son of the 4th son of the 2nd Baronet.

See also
Lord Elphinstone

Notes

References
Kidd, Charles, Williamson, David (editors). Debrett's Peerage and Baronetage (1990 edition). New York: St Martin's Press, 1990, 

Elphinstone
Elphinstone
Dormant baronetcies in the Baronetage of Nova Scotia
1628 establishments in Nova Scotia
1816 establishments in the United Kingdom